Rezolution Pictures is an Indigenous film and television production company based in Montreal, Quebec, Canada. The company was founded in 2001 by the husband and wife team of Ernest Webb and Catherine Bainbridge. Rezolution Pictures’ passionate team is led by co-founders/Presidents/directors/executive producers Ernest Webb and Catherine Bainbridge, Vice-President/executive producer Christina Fon, and CFO/executive producer Linda Ludwick.

Rezolution’s Emmy-nominated feature documentary, RUMBLE: The Indians Who Rocked the World, has won several awards, including Sundance Film Festival’s World Cinema Documentary Special Jury Award for Masterful Storytelling and three Canadian Screen Awards for Best Feature Length Documentary, Best Cinematography and Best Editing. Another of Rezolution’s award-winning feature documentaries is the 2010 Peabody winner Reel Injun. The company’s documentary series Gespe'gewa'gi: The Last Land premiered on APTN in February 2021. Its comedy series Moose TV, for the Showcase network in Canada, received the Indie Award for Best Comedy Series from the Canadian Film and Television Producers Association in 2008. 

Rezolution's authentic, intentional, and impactful storytelling spans several genres, including comedies, dramas, TV series and big-budget non-fiction documentary features, creating more than 100 hours of content. They have established original Indigenous content within mainstream media and sold programming around the world in major markets to broadcasters including APTN, CBC GEM, Superchannel, OMNI, TVO, CBC, RDI, ARTV, Télé-Québec, FNX, Knowledge, and Bell Media, and internationally with Vision Maker, PBS, Peacock +, and ARTE.

Rezolution has produced multiple works by directors of Quebec Aboriginal heritage, including Tracey Deer and Neil Diamond. Webb and Bainbridge are also co-founders of The Nation, a news magazine serving the Cree people of Eeyou Istchee.

Productions 
Factual

 Truth and Lies (2023)
 Searching for Cleopatra (2020)
 Aging Well (2020)
 Dream Catchers Bio (2018)
 Rumble: The Indians Who Rocked the World (2017)
 Working It Out Together (2010-2015)
 Indians & Aliens (2013-2017)
 The Oka Legacy (2015)
 The Wolverine: The Fight of the James Bay Cree (2014)
 Smoke Traders (2011)
 Reel Injun (2009)
 Down the Mighty River (2009)
 Club Native (2008)
 The Last Explorer (2008)
 Mommy Mommy (2008)
 Moose TV (2006)
 Dabb Iyiyuu (2004-2006)
 One More River: The Deal that Split the Cree (2004)
 Heavy Metal: A Mining Disaster in Northern Quebec (2004)
 Mohawk Girls (2004)
 Rez Rides (2004)

 Cree Spoken Here (2001)

Scripted

 Little Bird (2023)
 Mohawk Girls the series (2014-2017)

References

External links

Cree Cultural Institute profile

Companies based in Montreal
Film production companies of Canada
Documentary film production companies
Indigenous film and television production companies in Canada
Mass media companies established in 2001
Cinema of Quebec
Television production companies of Canada
Cree culture
Eeyou Istchee (territory)
Indigenous peoples in Montreal
Indigenous organizations in Quebec